is a 2002 Japanese animated fantasy film directed by Hiroyuki Morita, produced by Toshio Suzuki and Nozomu Takahashi, written by Reiko Yoshida, based on the manga The Cat Returns by Aoi Hiiragi, with music by Yuji Nomi, animated by Studio Ghibli for Tokuma Shoten, Nippon Television Network, Hakuhodo, Buena Vista Home Entertainment,  Mitsubishi and Toho and distributed by the latter company. It stars Chizuru Ikewaki, Yoshihiko Hakamada, Tetsu Watanabe, Yosuke Saito, Aki Maeda and Tetsurō Tamba. This is Hiroyuki Morita's first and only film as director for Studio Ghibli.

A spin-off of Whisper of the Heart, it was theatrically released in Japan on July 20, 2002 through Toho and in 2005 in the United States through Walt Disney Home Entertainment. It received an Excellence Prize at the 2002 Japan Media Arts Festival. GKIDS re-issued the film on Blu-ray and DVD on January 16, 2018 under a new deal with Studio Ghibli.

Plot

Haru Yoshioka is a shy but noble high school student who has a suppressed ability to talk with cats. One day, she saves a cat from being hit by a truck on a busy road. The cat she saved turns out to be Lune, Prince of the Cat Kingdom. As a thanks, the cats give Haru gifts of catnip and mice, and she is offered the Prince's hand in marriage. Her mixed reply is taken as a yes.

Wanting none of this, Haru hears a kind female voice which tells her to seek out Muta, a large white cat, and to get directions to the Cat Bureau from him. Muta leads her there to meet Baron Humbert von Gikkingen (the same Baron from Whisper of the Heart), who is a cat figurine given life by the work of his artist, and Toto, a stone raven who comes to life much like the Baron. Soon after meeting them, Haru and Muta are forcefully taken to the Cat Kingdom, leaving Toto and the Baron in the human world to follow the group from the air; they find the entrance to the Cat Kingdom on Earth: five lakes forming a cat's paw.

Haru is treated to a feast at the castle of the Cat King. She begins to slowly turn into a cat with tan paws, ears, nose, tail and whiskers (for a second, she also gets fangs), though she still remains mostly human. The King hopes that she will make a suitable bride for the Prince. At the feast, the Baron (in disguise) dances with Haru as part of the entertainment. He reveals to her that the more she loses herself in the kingdom, the more cat-like she will become, and that she has to rediscover her true self. When the Baron is discovered and is forced to fight the guards, he and Haru are helped by Yuki, a white cat maiden in the palace who had previously tried to warn Haru to leave the Cat Kingdom. After Yuki shows them an escape tunnel, Haru, the Baron and Muta move through a maze to a tower, which contains a portal to Haru's world. The King goes through a series of efforts to keep them in the kingdom long enough for Haru to remain trapped in her cat form; his ultimate plan is still to force her to become his daughter-in-law.

Prince Lune and his guards return to the Cat Kingdom, revealing the King was not acting on his behalf and that he planned on proposing to Yuki. Muta is revealed to be Renaldo Moon, a notorious criminal in the Kingdom (having devoured a whole lake of fish in one session). Haru learns that the strange voice who had advised her to go to the Cat Bureau was Yuki's. In her childhood, Haru had saved Yuki from starvation by giving her the fish crackers she was eating, and thus, Yuki has now repaid her kindness. After she rejects the King's marriage proposal outright, Muta tells Haru, "I respect a woman who stands up for herself" and proceeds to help her escape from the King's soldiers.

Eventually, the Baron, Haru and Muta escape the cats' realm, with the aid of Prince Lune and Toto, and Haru discovers her true self, telling the Baron how much she has come to like him. He tells her the doors of the Cat Bureau will be open for her again if the need ever arises. Haru returns to the human world with more self-confidence; after learning from her friend, Hiromi, that her former crush has broken up with his girlfriend, she simply replies "it doesn't matter anymore."

Cast

Yōko Honna, who voiced Shizuku in the original Whisper of the Heart film, provides the minor voice role of Chika, one of Haru's classmates.

Production

In 1995, Studio Ghibli released a film entitled Whisper of the Heart, based on a manga by Aoi Hiiragi, of a girl writing a fantasy novel. Although the girl's life had no magical elements, the film featured short fantasy scenes depicting that the girl was writing of the Baron, a character of her novel, which were so popular that an indirect sequel was made, featuring the Baron and another girl, a high school student named Haru. Muta also returned. The Cat Returns began as the "Cat Project" in 1999. Studio Ghibli received a request from a Japanese theme park to create a 20-minute short starring cats. Hayao Miyazaki wanted three key elements to feature in the short — these were the Baron, Muta (Moon) and a mysterious antique shop. Hiiragi was commissioned to create the manga equivalent of the short, which is called  and is published in English by Viz Media. The theme park later canceled the project. Miyazaki then took the existing work done by the "Cat Project" and used it as testing for future Ghibli directors — the short was now to be 45 minutes long. Responsibility was given to Hiroyuki Morita, who had started as an animator in 1999 for the film My Neighbors the Yamadas. Over a nine-month period he translated Hiiragi's Baron story into 525 pages of storyboards for what was to be The Cat Returns. Miyazaki and Toshio Suzuki decided to produce a feature-length film based entirely on Morita's storyboard; this was partly because Haru, the main character, had a "believable feel to her". It became the second theatrical (third overall) Studio Ghibli feature to be directed by someone other than Miyazaki or Isao Takahata. Telecom Animation Film, Production I.G and DR Movie helped animate the film.

Release

Box office
The film was released on July 20, 2002 as the highest-grossing domestic film at the Japanese box office in 2002 and the 7th highest-grossing film of the year overall. As of January 5, 2015, it is the 86th highest-grossing film in Japan, with ¥6.46 billion.

Critical reception
On review aggregator Rotten Tomatoes, 91% of 23 critic reviews are positive for The Cat Returns, and the average rating is 7.0/10. The website's critics consensus reads, "Sweetly charming and beautifully animated, The Cat Returns offers anime adventure suitable for the very young and young at heart." According to Metacritic, which gave a score of 70 out of 100 based on 11 critics, the film received "generally favorable reviews".

Lisa Nesselson of Variety described the film as "catchy entertainment for kids and adults" and highlighted the "thrillingly imaginative" finale. Michael Booth of The Denver Post noted that director Morita "has a slightly cruder, more realistic sense of the world and its looniness than does Miyazaki, and you can see where The Cat Returns moves on a different track even as it pays homage to Japan's current animation master." Neil Smith of the BBC noted that while the film "can't quite match the invention of 2003 Oscar-winner Spirited Away... The Cat Returns is still an enchanting, magical fable with a twisted vein of surrealism."

Home media
The film was dubbed in English by Walt Disney Pictures with the voices of Anne Hathaway, Cary Elwes, Peter Boyle, Elliott Gould, Tim Curry, Judy Greer, and Kristen Bell, for a release on DVD on February 22, 2005 alongside Nausicaä of the Valley of the Wind and Porco Rosso. Walt Disney Studios Home Entertainment released the film on Blu-ray in the United States was on June 16, 2015. GKIDS re-released the film on DVD and Blu-ray on January 16, 2018.

Manga

 is a 2002 manga written by Aoi Hiiragi and published by Tokuma Shoten. The story in the manga is largely the same as in its film adaptation, with a few minor differences, including a comedic ending in which the cat Natoru comes into Haru's room and pesters her, as well as a mildly dark revelation involving Haru's cat friend from childhood, Yuki (that Yuki was struck and killed by a vehicle and is in a kind of cat heaven, helping Haru out of gratitude for feeding her fish crackers when she was a little girl). The visual design for Baron, as originally illustrated by Hiiragi in the manga, featured him as a dark gray cat with large blue eyes and long pointed ears, while in the Studio Ghibli version, Baron is orange-and-yellow with smaller green eyes and shorter ears, a design change carried over from the way Baron was visually portrayed in the film adaptation of Whisper of the Heart. Haru's hair was visually longer and darker in Hiiragi's illustrations, although the character Muta retained his general appearance from the manga in the film adaptation. Muta is a side protagonist in both Hiiragi's manga and the film adaptation, while in Whisper of the Heart, he is an antagonistic villain called "Moon". Hiiragi alluded to this in the manga, which was mildly referenced in the film; Muta in the film was said to have been a morbidly obese cat who ate every fish in the kingdom, as rogue outlaw "Renaldo Moon", a fact he uses to frighten the Cat Kingdom into leaving Haru alone so she can run away and escape. The film portrays the Cat Kingdom as a physically real dimension parallel to Haru's home city, whereas Hiiragi portrays the Cat Kingdom as a heaven for cats who have passed away.

References

Further reading 
Anime
 
 
 
 
 
 
 
 

Manga

External links

  at Studio Ghibli 
  at Disney
 
 
 
 The Cat Returns at the Japanese Movie Database 
 

2000s adventure films
2000s children's animated films
2000s children's fantasy films
2000s English-language films
2000s Japanese-language films
2002 animated films
2002 anime films
2002 directorial debut films
2002 drama films
2002 fantasy films
2002 films
Adventure anime and manga
Animated adventure films
Animated coming-of-age films
Animated drama films
Animated films about cats
Anime films based on manga
Anime spin-offs
Children's drama films
Drama anime and manga
Films about cats
Films about shapeshifting
Film spin-offs
Films scored by Yuji Nomi
Films set in a fictional country
Films set in Japan
Japanese animated fantasy films
Japanese drama films
Studio Ghibli animated films
Viz Media manga
Walt Disney Pictures films